The Himalayan Database: The Expedition Archives of Elizabeth Hawley is a large digital and published record of mountaineering in the Nepalese Himalayas since 1903 (i.e. it does not include the Pakistan Himalaya peaks such as K2 and Nanga Parbat etc.), maintained by Richard Salisbury who digitised the records.

Background

The Himalayan Database (HDB), was developed and maintained by Elizabeth Hawley, who remained involved up to her death in 2018. It was published as a CD and an 80-page paperback up until 2017. From 2017 onwards, records of expeditions, their members have been searchable online, or available as a complete downloadable database. It fills in for the absence of officially maintained records. It has been published by the American Alpine Club.

As well as being an important repository for climbing statistics on Himalayan mountains, the database also became known for its decisions to disregard or dispute various climbs.  Notable cases was the decision not to record a 1990 ascent of Cho Oyu by British climber Alan Hinkes, which put a question-mark over Hinkes' claim to have summited all 14 eight-thousanders; and the 1997 ascent of Lhotse by Italian climbers Fausto De Stefani and Sergio Martini which forced Sergio Martini to reclimb Lhotse in 2000 to verify he had climbed all 14 eight-thousanders (De Stefani decided not to re-climb).

Bibliography

See also
 Eight-thousanders
 List of Mount Everest records

References

External links
 The Himalayan Database, main website for the database
 Graphical Interface for The Himalayan Database

Mountaineering books
Himalayas
Books about the Himalayas